Neoconocephalus retusus, the round-tipped conehead, is a species of katydid or bush cricket in the family Tettigoniidae. It is found in the eastern United States and southern Canada.

Adult round-tipped coneheads range from 37 to 52 mm in length, and are commonly found in wet grassy and weedy areas during August, September, and October.

References

Further reading

External links

 

retusus
Insects described in 1878